Gamma Equulei, Latinized from γ Equulei, is a double star in the northern constellation of Equuleus. The star is drifting closer to the Sun with a radial velocity of −16.5 km/s.

Properties
It has a spectrum corresponding to an A9 main sequence star, but with unusual abundances of strontium, chromium, and europium. Stars with this type of spectral peculiarity are called Ap stars. The abundances of some metals are believed to be due to chemical stratification in the slowly-rotating star, unusual for hot main sequence stars. A fairly wide range of spectral types have been published for γ Equulei, ranging from A5 to F1, some of them also indicating unusual abundances of iron in the spectrum. γ Equulei has particularly sharp absorption lines in its spectrum, a sign of very slow rotation.

γ Equulei undergoes rapid periodic variations in brightness, which places it among the rapidly oscillating Ap (roAp) stars.  The apparent magnitude varies between extremes of +4.58 and +4.77. It shows pulsations in several periods near 12 minutes. The strongest pulsation is at 11.7 minutes; others are found at 11.9, 12.2, and 12.4 minutes. These are identified as a series of even and odd p-mode (pressure-induced) pulsations.

The surface magnetic field of γ Equulei undergoes slow variation, ranging from +577 G to –1,101 G.  Although only 67 years of magnetic field measurements are available, a period of  has been fit to the data.  This is thought to be the rotation period of γ Equulei.

γ Equulei has a magnitude 8.69 companion at an angular separation of 1.26 arcseconds.

References

External links 
www.wolframalpha.com/input/?i=gamma+equulei
www.alcyone.de/SIT/alpcvn/SIT003258

Rapidly oscillating Ap stars

Equuleus
Equulei, Gamma
Durchmusterung objects
Equulei, 05
201601
104521
8097